Alto Trek is a computer game, developed by Gene Ball and Rick Rashid for the Xerox Alto while they were graduate students at the University of Rochester during the late 1970s. It is one of the first networked multiplayer games.

Gameplay

Alto Trek is a multiplayer game where each player uses their own Alto workstation to control a starship. The objective of the game is to destroy the enemy without being destroyed. A player can choose between being a Klingon, Romulan, or Terran. The game can be played by one player, but there will be no enemy to destroy.

There is no central server that maintains game state. Each Alto "multicasts" its game information on the shared Ethernet that all players must be on. The "multicast" address on which to rendezvous is a function of the number of stellar systems in the game. (see manual)

Development
The manual for version 2.1 is dated August 1979 and authored by Allen Wells, Bob Baldwin, and Steve Quarterman. It confirms that the game was authored primarily by Ball.

Around 1997, while a vice president at Microsoft, Rashid began to reimplement the game as a way to teach himself to use the DirectX programming API. This resulted in the development of Microsoft Allegiance.

References

External links
Internet Archive - Alto Trek 2.1 manual

1978 video games
Video games based on Star Trek
Xerox Alto games
Video games developed in the United States